Overcarsh House is a historic home located at Charlotte, Mecklenburg County, North Carolina.  It was built between 1879 and 1898, and is a two-story, rectangular Queen Anne style frame dwelling. It is sheathed in weatherboard, sits on a brick foundation, and has a hipped roof on the main block. It features extended gable-roofed bays, a conical-roofed tower, shallow entrance porch, and decorative gables.  Its builder, Elias Overcarsh (1821–1898), was a prominent Methodist minister. The Overcarsh family owned the house until 1966.

It was listed on the National Register of Historic Places in 1983.

References

Houses on the National Register of Historic Places in North Carolina
Queen Anne architecture in North Carolina
Houses completed in 1898
Houses in Charlotte, North Carolina
National Register of Historic Places in Mecklenburg County, North Carolina